New York State Route 747 (NY 747) is a state highway in northeast Orange County, New York, in the United States. It officially came into existence when exit 32 on Interstate 84 was completed and opened in 2007. Most of NY 747 follows Drury Lane, once a highway maintained by Orange County as County Route 54.

The road provides easy access to Stewart International Airport via International Boulevard, a newly built connecting road. The lack of such access has long been seen as an obstacle to the airport's development. The Port Authority of New York and New Jersey has taken the airport over from former private lessees National Express with the intent of realizing long-held hopes of making the airport the New York Metropolitan Area's fourth major airport; improved access to the airport is seen as essential to that goal.

Drury Lane, which divided the airport property from what is now Stewart State Forest, save for a small corridor along the road near the interstate, was long the line in the sand for local environmental activists who opposed any development to its west. Construction of the highway involved significant relocation of some of the route for these and other issues.

Route description

The entire route runs through wooded land that has remained undeveloped since being seized for a planned expansion of the airport in the early 1970s.

747 begins at the junction of Drury and NY 207 near the Grange Hall at the center of the onetime hamlet of Little Britain. A traffic light was installed at the intersection.

It remains a two-lane road along a new alignment through the wooded area between the airport and the state forest. At the junction with International Boulevard, it expands to a four-lane divided route from there to I-84. Here it passes the western end of the airport's main runway, and sometimes large C-5 cargo planes from Stewart Air National Guard Base can be seen taking off right above the road. While one more traffic light has been allowed in this section, development here will likely be limited since much of the land to the west is either wetlands or part of the FAA-mandated Runway Protection Zone, a  trapezoid in which no building is allowed.

The road climbs slightly into the Town of Newburgh and then to the exit. A new overpass was built; the old one was dismantled. The westbound Interstate 84 exit and entrance takes the form of half of a diamond interchange, while the eastbound exit and entrance forms half of an A2/B2 type partial cloverleaf to avoid encroaching on wetlands in the southwest quadrant of the interchange.

The ramp from westbound 84 to 747 goes over a small bridge built to protect the Catskill Aqueduct from the vibrations of passing trucks. The presence of the aqueduct, which carries 40% of New York City's water supply and runs right alongside the road just north of 84, forced the construction of a new section of road a short distance north of the interstate. Route 747 here deviates from the historical route of Drury Lane, bends into the Town of Montgomery and reaches NY 17K, its northern terminus, at the intersection with Stone Castle Road. The section of Stone Castle Road north of Route 17K has itself been slightly relocated to provide for a better location for the intersection, at which another traffic light was erected.

The remaining section of Drury Lane, which has houses and businesses, now ends in a cul-de-sac near the new road and the aqueduct. This small stub of a road remains the outlet for several small private roads which end in cul-de-sacs of their own. A few structures formerly on the west side of Drury Lane now remain on the west side of the renamed Route 747. Despite this plan, a new Valero-branded convenience store and gas station has been opened at the current intersection of 17K and Drury to take advantage of interstate traffic coming off the exit.

History

The construction of Route 747 is the culmination of a lengthy regional controversy about the airport and the role it should play in the local economy. Before the 1970 closure of Stewart Air Force Base, Drury Lane was just another two-lane rural north–south route in the farmlands west of the base.

Development controversy
Plans initiated by then-governor Nelson Rockefeller changed that. With supersonic transport (SST) considered at the time to be the next major development in air travel, Rockefeller wanted New York to have an airport that could handle both the SSTs and regular jets. Accordingly, plans were drawn up for a major expansion of the airport.

The state moved to condemn much of the land between Drury Lane and Maybrook in order to more than double Stewart's size. Families that had lived there since the Revolution fought bitterly. Eventually they were all evicted, but only after the state had promised never to develop the land and American SST development was canceled due to rising fuel costs.

The former saw the recreational and conservation possibilities of keeping it a protected area; the latter pointed to ideal real estate in a region that was beginning to lose its job base.

The privatization of the airport in 2000 led the state to finally begin construction of the interchange, after Governor George Pataki designated much of the western lands as Stewart State Forest. It was stalled for three years by a lawsuit filed by several national and local environmental groups alleging that required environmental reviews were not properly conducted. On November 21, 2005, a compromise was reached in which most of the land that had not been designated as part of the state forest was and  near the exit was made available for development. Construction of the exit and the surrounding roads proceeded apace.

Construction
Drury Lane as it was could not serve to bring the kind of traffic a major airport would handle. The road would have to be widened to at least four lanes and realigned. The presence of the aqueduct also complicated matters greatly. New York City's Department of Environmental Protection insisted that any new roads over the aqueduct bridge it to protect the aging pipeline from damage that vibrations from trucks passing overhead could cause.

Since Drury crosses the aqueduct north of the interstate on relatively level ground, a bridge would have added considerable expense to the project. However, a federally required 1999 value engineering study recommended instead rerouting Drury to make a four-way intersection at Stone Castle Road and Route 17K. While at the time there were some other issues seen as holding this up, eventually this was the option chosen.

The access road required some deep cuts to keep it level at the intersection with Drury Lane. Bill Gorton, NYSDOT's regional design engineer, compared it to the initial construction of I-84. "We tell our young engineers to take a good look at what we're doing here because chances are they won't see anything like this again in their careers", said Rashid Shariff, DOT's engineer in charge. Over  of dirt were moved. A quarter of that was used to fill a ravine the road crosses; the rest will be used as needed on the airport property.

The project's design took into account several considerations for rare or endangered species native to the area, which earned it an Exemplary Ecosystem Initiative award from the Federal Highway Administration.  These included the construction of 12 vernal pools adjacent to the road to provide habitat for the Blue-spotted Salamander and Jefferson Salamander and box culverts to allow them to safely cross under the road, avoiding tree removal during the season when Indiana bats are roosting, and siting new wetlands to avoid impacting Purple milkweed.

Prior to the project, Drury Lane had been maintained by Orange County as County Route 54. In February 2007, it was announced that the highway would become state-maintained and be designated as NY 747 once the project was completed. On July 30, 2007, Route 747 was de facto open. Drury Lane was closed off north of the aqueduct and traffic was routed onto the new roadway between both termini, and on the new overpass. Road crews began removing the pavement from the former roadbed and dismantling the old overpass.

Although NYSDOT refers to this access road as Stewart Boulevard in their press release, all area signage refers to the access road as International Boulevard, a last-minute change by the Port Authority of New York and New Jersey.

Major intersections

See also

List of county routes in Orange County, New York

References

External links

747
Transportation in Orange County, New York
Articles containing video clips